No Joke is a Canadian documentary released in 2013.

Storyline
No Joke is about three Canadian stand-up comedians who are "rejected as hopelessly unfunny by hometown audiences and thus flee to America for a whirlwind comedy tour (accompanied by intentionally 'unfunny' test subject, Vibrato 3.72 'The Human Vibrator') to determine once and for all whether they have any star potential. Their penultimate comedic judgement comes via private audition for Jamie Masada, owner of the World Famous Laugh Factory in Hollywood, California. The results are hilarious, heartbreaking, and completely unexpected." The film is directed by Matt Frame and is the follow-up to the 2004 film Baghdad or Bust.

Release
No Joke had its World Premiere in Vancouver, Canada on January 12, 2013.

References

External links
 
 

2013 films
English-language Canadian films
Canadian documentary films
Documentary films about comedy and comedians
2010s English-language films
2010s Canadian films